Several characters made their debuts on Coronation Street in 1977, including Tracy Barlow, who appeared as a newborn infant and is still with the show as of 2022.

Suzie Birchall

Suzanne "Suzie" Goodwin (née Birchall) was played by actress Cheryl Murray from January 1977 to December 1979 and then again in 1983. Suzie was a cynical peroxide blonde teenager who was more interested in having fun than being responsible. She made fast friends with Gail Potter and shared a room with her at Elsie Tanner's house. Her first storyline involved her getting her foot stuck through Hilda Ogden's ceiling. Her father Bob was a control freak and he came to take her home. When he tried to take her by force, Steve Fisher intervened, getting a punch in the face before Bob washed his hands of his daughter and drove off alone. She later kept company with a sugar daddy and found fleeting romance, which was her ticket out of the Street. Off-screen, she married Terry Goodwin but the marriage soon soured when it was revealed that Goodwin abused her, leading to her return to Weatherfield in early 1983. She moved back in with Elsie and as soon as she filed for divorce, went back to her old fun-loving ways.  However Suzie went too far when she tried to seduce Gail's husband, Brian Tilsley. When Gail and Elsie learned of this, Gail ended their friendship and Elsie threw Suzie out. Immediately after this, Suzie left the Street again and this time for good.

In February 2018, over 35 years after she last saw Suzie, Gail mentioned her to granddaughter Bethany Platt.

Tracy Barlow

Sam Littlewood

Sam Littlewood was Rita Littlewood's uncle on her on her father Harold's side. Sam was a former wheelwright and was then a scrap-metal dealer. In 1977, he gave Rita away when she married Len Fairclough. In his short but concise speech as father of the bride, Sam gave his blessing to the union, and went on to drink everyone under the table at the reception. He later retired to Blackpool from Blackburn, and it was here that Rita turned to him when she walked out on Len in 1980. Despairing of them both, Sam forced Len to go to Blackpool and plead to Rita to return to Coronation Street with him. 

1977
, Coronation Street
Coronation Street